Silvana De Stefano is an Italian sculptor and architect.

Biography
Born in Naples, she moved to Rome where at the Accademia di Belle Arti, she attended Pericle Fazzini and Greco lectures on sculpture and Toti Scialoja lectures on painting. She graduated in 1986 in Architecture at La Sapienza-Università degli Studi in Rome.

Once graduated, she assisted the post-graduate lectures on urban planning engineering and architecture at the Università degli Studi in Rome.
In 1989, she won a scholarship from the CNR (National Counsel on Research) at the University of California, Berkeley.  She settled in California where while studying, she dedicated herself to sculpture and painting.

In 1992, she moved to New York City where she met the famous Art Gallery owner, Leo Castelli who suggested her to organize a solo exhibition at his West Broadway Art Gallery. But the artist had to postpone the exhibition when she committed herself, in 1994, commissioned by the Finmeccanica, to work on an installation within the company headquarters in Rome, the Palazzo di Vetro, build in 1963 (by Giò Ponti), Piazza Monte Grappa.

During the lengthy process of setting up this work, that the artist entitles "Movements", De Stefano is assisted by Leo Castelli, who visits her in Rome and follows the works from New York.

In 1998, commissioned by SACE, she created a sculpture called "Suspended Column", a brand new project within the SACE headquarters, Piazza Poli, behind the Trevi Fountain.

In 2001, within an architectural and interior design project, she transformed an old industrial manufacture into a vast conversion which becomes her home and study and which arouse interest in the architectural design world. Few magazines published reviews on it: Mercedes 2004, Architectural Digest Italy, Architectural Digest Mexico 2009 (that not only dedicated an article but also the front cover), Compasses Architecture & Design 2008, Shooting Photographic Fashion Style & Design Mercedes-Benz Magazine 2011.
Today, the converted space is being used for both film making (new takes) and television. Several films and fictions were shot on location.

In 2002, she drew the Manifesto for UNESCO Italian National Commission.

In 2004, she mounted an exhibition of paintings within the 14th century old refectory of Palazzo Venezia in Rome. The exhibition was curated by both Claudio Strinati and the architect De Stefano, the latter focusing on the organization of the exhibition.

In 2006, for the introduction of the new Alfa Romeo Brera, a new way of thinking Art, at the Spazio Etoile -Fondazione Memmo, took place the solo exhibition curated by the Art Gallery owner Pino Casagrande entitled "Personale di Silvana De Stefano".
Always in 2006, was elaborated and discussed a graduation thesis on the artist work entitled "Silvana De Stefano. The magic of the Suspended Balances" at the Facoltà di Lettere e Filosofia degli Studi of Rome-La Sapienza.

In 2008/2009, she did get involved with a project of two artistic interventions for the internal revamping of residential buildings in Milan.

In 2009, she planned a project for the Expo 2009 for the town of Warsaw, Poland and also carried out the sculpture/installation "Elements" in Milan.
Between the 90's until today, she worked on several architectural and interior design projects within privately owned buildings.

Main projects and works
1994: Installation "Movements", Palazzo di Vetro (Giò Ponti), Finmeccanica headquarters, Rome
1998: Installation "Suspended Column", Palazzo Poli, Sace headquarters, Rome
2002: Manifesto for UNESCO Italian National Commission
2004: Exhibition "Spazio-Luce", Palazzio Venezia, Rome
2006: Exhibition at the "Spazio Etoile", Fondazione Memmo, Rome
2008: Two artistic interventions for the internal revamping of residential buildings, Milan
2009: Project planning for the Expo 2009, Warsaw, Poland
2009: Sculpture/installation "Elements", Milan
2009: Workshop on innovation, Bnlparibas, Rome

Design
The architect/sculptor carried out interior design projects in both Italy and US.

The artist converted living/working space was mentioned in:
Mercedes 2004 "La rivista delle idee in movimento"
Compasses, Dubai, 2008, Architecture & Design Magazine
AD Architectural Digest, 2009, Italian edition (US interior design magazine distributed across the globe)
AD Architectural Digest, 2009, International edition
Mercedes-Benz, 2011 Fashion Style & Design

References
Colonna Sospesa, (Italian) Catalogue of the installation, Silvana De Stefano, De Luca Editore, Rome, 2001
Suspended Column, (English) Catalogue of the installation, Silvana De Stefano,  De Luca Editore, Rome, 2001
Spazio luce, Catalogue of the exhibition, Silvana De Stefano, Roma, Palazzo Venezia,  July–August 2004, by Claudio Strinati  and Costanzo Costantini
Movimenti, Catalogue of the installation, Silvana De Stefano, Rome, Finmeccanica headquarters, by Achille Bonito Oliva, Rome, 2008
Il Messaggero, daily paper, 3 December 2001
Il Tempo, daily paper, 7 July 2004
La Stampa, daily paper, 10 July 2004.
Il Messaggero, daily paper, 10 July 2004
Il Giornale, daily paper, Rome ed., 12 July 2004.
Il Tempo, daily paper, 15 July 2004
Corriere della Sera, daily paper, 24 July 2004
Rinascita, daily paper, 29 July 2004
Il Messaggero, daily paper, 02nd August2004.
L'Unità, daily paper, 18 August 2004
Mercedes-Benz, Spazi per creare, December 2004
Bimestrale Dell'Ordine degli Architetti di Roma, January–February 57/2005
Compasses Architecture & Design, Dubai, November 2008
AD Architectural Digest, Italian Edition, March 2009
Il Messaggero, daily paper, 6 March 2009
Corriere della Sera, daily pape, 7 March 2009
Italia, daily paper, 10 March 2009
Avanti, daily paper, 12 March 2009
Il Giornale, daily paper, 21 March 2009
AD Architectural Digest, International Magazine, May 2009
Mercedes-Benz, Fashion Style & Design, September 2011

External links
Leo Castelli, Achille Bonito Oliva, Claudio Strinati, Giuseppe Appella

Architects from Naples
Living people
Artists from Naples
Year of birth missing (living people)
Artists from California
University of California, Berkeley alumni
Italian emigrants to the United States
Sapienza University of Rome alumni
20th-century Italian sculptors
21st-century Italian sculptors